António de Jesus Pereira (11 February 1955 – 27 September 2010), known as Jesus, was a Portuguese football goalkeeper and manager.

Club career
Born in Espinho, Jesus finished his youth career at FC Porto, but never appeared for the team as a senior. After a couple of seasons with S.C. Beira-Mar (his first in the Primeira Liga) he signed for Varzim SC, then Vitória de Guimarães after three more years in the top flight.

With the Minho side, Jesus acted as backup in his first seasons, but was the undisputed starter in his last three, helping Vitória finish third – all 30 matches played and only 22 goals conceded, a competition-best – and reach the quarter-finals in the UEFA Cup in 1986–87, also appearing in the following year's Portuguese Cup final, lost 0–1 to former club Porto. He left in 1988, playing one top division campaign apiece with Leixões S.C. and G.D. Chaves, being relegated with the former but finishing fifth with the latter.

The 35-year-old Jesus returned to Vitória in the summer of 1990, playing all 38 league games in his debut campaign but subsequently being second-choice. He retired in 1994 at the age of 39 after one year with former side Chaves in the second level, having made 363 appearances in Portugal's top tier during 16 seasons.

Already as an active player, Jesus started a managing career, acting as player-coach with Leixões (three matches) and Chaves (eleven). His subsequent career was almost exclusively spent in divisions two and three, but he led C.S. Marítimo to the seventh position in the top flight in 1994–95; additionally, he spent the 2004–05 season as Guimarães' goalkeeper coach.

International career
After practically all of the Portugal national team defected following the infamous Saltillo Affair at the 1986 FIFA World Cup in Mexico, Jesus was chosen by manager Juca as his starter for the UEFA Euro 1988 qualifying campaign. He made his debut on 4 February 1987 at the age of 32, in a 1–0 friendly home win over Belgium.

Death
On 27 September 2010, around 20:00, Jesus was returning home from training with local S.C. Espinho in the third division. Suddenly, he fell to the ground after suffering a heart attack, being rushed to the hospital but dying shortly after at the age of 55.

References

External links

1955 births
2010 deaths
People from Espinho, Portugal
Portuguese footballers
Association football goalkeepers
Primeira Liga players
Liga Portugal 2 players
FC Porto players
G.D. Chaves players
S.C. Beira-Mar players
Varzim S.C. players
Vitória S.C. players
Leixões S.C. players
Portugal international footballers
Portuguese football managers
Primeira Liga managers
Liga Portugal 2 managers
Leixões S.C. managers
G.D. Chaves managers
C.S. Marítimo managers
F.C. Paços de Ferreira managers
S.C. Covilhã managers
C.D. Tondela managers
Sportspeople from Aveiro District